The Taipei Metro Sanchong Elementary School station is a station on the Luzhou Line located in Sanchong District, New Taipei, Taiwan. The station opened for service on 3 November 2010.

Station overview
This two-level, underground station has an island platform. It is located beneath the intersection of Sanhe Rd., Sec. 3 and Renai Rd., Anle St., and Anxing St. and was opened for service on 3 November 2010 when the Luzhou Line opened.

Construction
It has one entrance, one emergency exit, one accessibility elevator, and two vent shafts.

Station Design
The theme for the station is "Wings Over a Garden", as part of a common theme of egrets for the Luzhou Line.

Station layout

Exits
Single Exit: Intersection of Sanhe Rd. Sec. 3 and Renai St.

Around the station
Sanchong Elementary School
Sanhe Night Market
Jieshou Plaza
Haude Police Station (between this station and Sanhe Junior High School station)
Guangrong Junior High School
Guangrong Elementary School
National Highway No. 1

References

Zhonghe–Xinlu line stations
Railway stations opened in 2010